Pesquet is a surname. Notable people with the surname include:

 Robert Pesquet (1917–2010), French politician
 Thomas Pesquet (born 1978), French aerospace engineer, pilot, and European Space Agency astronaut

See also
 Pesquet's parrot, a parrot species